The New Hampshire Wildcats represented the University of New Hampshire in Women's Hockey East Association play during the 2015–16 NCAA Division I women's ice hockey season.

Offseason
July 1: Brooke Avery named to Hockey East All Academic All-Star Team

Recruiting

Roster

2015–16 Wildcats

Schedule

|-
!colspan=12 style=""| Regular Season

|-
!colspan=12 style=""| WHEA Tournament

References

New Hampshire
New Hampshire Wildcats women's ice hockey seasons
New Ham
New Ham